is a passenger railway station located in the city of Okegawa, Saitama, Japan, operated by East Japan Railway Company (JR East).

Lines
Okegawa Station is served by the Takasaki Line, with through Shonan-Shinjuku Line and Ueno-Tokyo Line services to and from the Tokaido Line.

Layout
The station has one side platform and one island platform serving three tracks, connected by a footbridge, with an elevated station building located above the platforms. The station has a "Midori no Madoguchi" staffed ticket office.

Platforms

History
The station opened on 1 March 1885. The station became part of the JR East network after the privatization of the JNR on 1 April 1987.

Passenger statistics
In fiscal 2019, the station was used by an average of 26,296 passengers daily (boarding passengers only).

Surrounding area
Okegawa City Hall
site of Okegawa-shuku

See also
List of railway stations in Japan

References

External links

JR East Okegawa Station

Railway stations in Japan opened in 1885
Railway stations in Saitama Prefecture
Takasaki Line
Shōnan-Shinjuku Line
Okegawa, Saitama